A Man's Man is a lost 1929  silent film produced and distributed by Metro-Goldwyn-Mayer and directed by James Cruze. It stars William Haines and was released with a soundtrack of music and effects. It is based on a Broadway play, A Man's Man by Patrick Kearney. Greta Garbo and John Gilbert notably appear in a cameo. The film was released with a sychronised music score and sound effects track; the film is believed to be lost, although the sound discs exist and are currently held at the UCLA Film and Television Archive.

Cast
 William Haines - Mel
 Josephine Dunn - Peggy
 Sam Hardy - Charlie
 Mae Busch - Violet
 John Gilbert - Himself
 Greta Garbo - Herself
 Gloria Davenport - Annie
 Delmer Daves (uncredited)
 Fred Niblo (uncredited)

References

External links
 
 

1929 films
American silent feature films
Films directed by James Cruze
Lost American films
Metro-Goldwyn-Mayer films
1929 comedy films
Silent American comedy films
American black-and-white films
1929 lost films
Lost comedy films
1920s American films
1920s English-language films